This is a list of episodes of the Japanese anime Sola. The episodes are directed by Tomoki Kobayashi and produced by the Japanese animation studio Nomad. The anime is based on the mixed media project of the same name originally conceived by Naoki Hisaya (main writer of Kanon) with original character design by Naru Nanao (designer of D.C.: Da Capo). The story follows the life of a male high school student named Yorito Morimiya who meets a strange non-human girl named Matsuri Shihō and gets entangled in a fight between her and a man named Takeshi Tsujido who is trying to kill her. The anime aired between April 7, 2007 and June 30, 2007, containing thirteen episodes. Two additional episodes were made available exclusively on DVD volumes four and five as original video animations; the first was released on September 25, 2007, and the second was on October 26, 2007.

Episodes

Anime television series (2007)

OVAs (2007)

References
 General

 Specific

External links
Official website for the Sola anime 

Sola